Charles E. Collins was an All-American football wide receiver at Cal State Northridge University. He played professionally with the Edmonton Eskimos of the Canadian Football League.

Collins was a former wide-receiver assistant coach for the San Francisco 49ers, Cincinnati Bengals, and the United Football League Sacramento Mountain Lions. He is currently head coach at Oaks Christian High School, as offensive coordinator he helped lead the Lions to a CIF championship in 2017. In 2018, the Lions finished the season 12-1 ranked #8 in the country.  Current member of the Pro Football Hall of Fame instructional staff where he works with youth American football wide receivers in major cities across the U.S.

Collins is called "Coach C." by the athletes he works with.  He has been helping high school athletes from all over California earn college scholarships. His coaching career began at Santa Monica Community College, where he worked with Chad "Ochocinco" Johnson and Steve Smith. Collins is known for transforming Johnson from a high school quarterback into a successful wide receiver. Collins' coaching and continued encouragement kept Johnson focused on football allowing him to earn a spot on the Oregon State University team during his final year of eligibility. He was then drafted by the Cincinnati Bengals in 2001, and still accredits his NFL success to Coach Collins. Collilns and Johnson remain close and have teamed up to release a wide-receiver training app called "In The Breaks".

References

Living people
Year of birth missing (living people)
California State University, Northridge alumni
Cal State Northridge Matadors football players
Edmonton Elks players